Iriki may refer to:
Iriki, Kagoshima, former town in Japan merged to Satsumasendai in 2004
10178 Iriki, a minor planet named for the town

People with the surname Iriki include:
Satoshi Iriki (born 1967), Japanese baseball player
Yusaku Iriki (born 1972), Japanese baseball player